Karl Brandner (1898–1961) was born in Oak Park, Illinois and trained as an artist at the Art Institute of Chicago and the Chicago Fine Art Academy, Brander is best remembered as a regional artist who worked primarily in landscapes. Brander's landscapes and cityscapes were exhibited during his lifetime at the Hoosier Salon, the Chicago Gallery Association, and the Palette and Chisel Club.

References

1898 births
1961 deaths
Artists from Oak Park, Illinois
Painters from Illinois
School of the Art Institute of Chicago alumni
20th-century American painters
American male painters
20th-century American male artists